Prehistory is the debut studio album by American experimental rock band Circle X. It was recorded in 1981 but was not released until 1983, jointly through record labels Index and Enigma.

Background 

Prehistory was recorded upon their return to New York City, after staying nine months in Dijon, France.

Release 

The LP went out of print rapidly, but was later reissued semi-legally by the French label Sordide Sentimentale, featuring the addition of a booklet of essay texts and skin disorder photos.

Track listing

Critical reception 

Trouser Press, whilst calling the album "more ambitious" than 1979's Circle X EP, wrote, "submerging energy in sloppy polyrhythms and echoey dub production, the album sometimes drags haphazardly and generally lacks its predecessor's field-plowing impact."

Personnel 
 Circle X

 David Letendre – drums, percussion, guitar on "Current", album cover concept
 Rick Letendre – guitar, drums, percussion, tape operation, vocals, album cover concept
 Tony Pinotti – guitar, tape operation, vocals, bass guitar on "Current", album cover concept
 Bruce Witsiepe – guitar, tape operation, vocals, album cover concept

 Additional personnel

 Jason Huang – Hammond organ on "Underworld"

 Technical

 David Lichtenstein – engineering

References

External links 

 

1983 albums